Two ships of the Royal Navy have been named HMS Swallow Prize:

  was a French 18-gun sixth rate, captured in 1692. She was recaptured in 1696 by a French privateer off Weymouth.
She was wrecked on 17 November 1711 off Corsica.

See also

References
 

Royal Navy ship names